Rumst (old spelling: Rumpst) is a municipality located in the Belgian province of Antwerp.

Industry in Rumst, like Boom, was heavily focused around the production of clay products like bricks. This industry has largely disappeared after 1970.

In Rumst, the river Rupel starts as a combination of the Dijle and Nete (river) rivers.

In 2021, Rumst had a total population of 15,146. The total area is 19.90 km² (7.7 sq mi).

Notable residents
Kristof Calvo,  Belgian politician, was born in Rumst
Yvonne Verbeeck, actress

References

External links
 
  Official website

 
Municipalities of Antwerp Province
Populated places in Antwerp Province